Project Censored the Movie: Ending The Reign of Junkfood News is a 2013 documentary film about the news media in the United States written and directed by Christopher Oscar and Doug Hecker.  The film is based on the work by Project Censored, a media organization at Sonoma State University that publishes under-reported news stories.  It was released in April 2013 at the Sonoma International Film Festival.

References

Further reading

Doherty, Bryan. (April 24, 2013). Project Censored premieres. Martinez News-Gazette. 
Long, Nevin. (February 13, 2014). 'Project' unearths suppressed reporting. Laney Tower.
Stachnik, Brandon. (November 19, 2013). Junk food news reigns supreme. Sonoma State Star.

External links
Official site
 

2013 films
2013 documentary films
American documentary films
Documentary films about journalism
2010s English-language films
2010s American films